The 1954 La Flèche Wallonne was the 18th edition of La Flèche Wallonne cycle race and was held on 8 May 1954. The race started in Charleroi and finished in Liège. The race was won by Germain Derycke.

General classification

References

1954 in road cycling
1954
1954 in Belgian sport
1954 Challenge Desgrange-Colombo